Madhabilata Mitra is a ramp model. She was crowned as Sananda Tilottama 2006.

Early life 
She was born in a middle-class family in Kolkata (16 December).
She & Her Brother Arka grew up with single Parenthood of Mother Sanjukta.and grew up studying Arts. In the year 2006 on 27 May she won a  beauty contest Sananda Tilottama and she started off her career since then.

Career 
Mitra has participated in the Blenders Pride Fashion Tour, the Indian Leather Products Association (ILPA) Show, Ritu Kumar, and the International Institute of Fashion Design. She has also won a title as ''Miss hot body'' in the year 2009.

Personal life 
Madhabilata got married on 20 January 2014 with her long time boyfriend Bhupesh Gupta.

References

Living people
Female models from Kolkata
Year of birth missing (living people)